Elangbam is both a given name and a surname. 

Notable people with the given name include:
Elangbam Panthoi Chanu (born 1996), Indian footballer
Elangbam Nilakanta Singh (1927-2000), Indian poet and critic

Notable people with the surname include:
Elangbam Haridev Singh, noted Academician, worked at Royal University of Bhutan from 2009 till 2021...
Abenao Elangbam (born 1986), Indian actress